Ushannapalli is a village in Kalva Srirampur mandal, Karimnagar district of the state of Telangana, India.

References

Villages in Karimnagar district